Hippocampus waleananus, the Walea soft coral pygmy seahorse, was regarded as a synonym of Hippocampus satomiae, Lourie & Kuiter, 2008, however, some taxonomists suggested this name should be valid. The species was described in 2009 from a single specimen which was found close to the island Walea. This species is endemic to the Togian Islands in Indonesia, and is associated with specific soft corals.

References 

waleananus
Taxa named by Martin F. Gomon
Taxa named by Rudie Hermann Kuiter
Fish described in 2009
Taxobox binomials not recognized by IUCN